This is the progression of world record improvements of the 80 metres hurdles M85 division of Masters athletics.

Key

References

Masters athletics world record progressions